IMEP may refer to:

Indicated mean effective pressure
Inner Mongolia Education Press
Institut de Microélectronique, Electromagnétisme et Photonique of the École nationale supérieure d'électronique et de radioélectricité de Grenoble
Internet MANET Encapsulation Protocol, a kind of ad hoc routing protocol
 IMEP (chemotherapy)

See also
KIMEP University of Kazakhstan